The Houston Astros' 1991 season was a season in American baseball. It involved the Houston Astros attempting to win the National League West.

The Astros finished 65-97, which tied the 1965 and 1975 clubs for the most losses in franchise history at the time.

Offseason
 October 4, 1990: Bill Gullickson was released by the Astros.
 January 10, 1991: Glenn Davis was traded by the Astros to the Baltimore Orioles for Curt Schilling, Steve Finley and Pete Harnisch.

Regular season

Standings

Record vs. opponents

Roster

Player stats

Batting

Starters by position
Note: Pos = Position; G = Games played; AB = At bats; H = Hits; Avg. = Batting average; HR = Home runs; RBI = Runs batted in

Other batters
Note: G = Games played; AB = At bats; H = Hits; Avg. = Batting average; HR = Home runs; RBI = Runs batted in

Pitching

Starting pitchers 
Note: G = Games pitched; IP = Innings pitched; W = Wins; L = Losses; ERA = Earned run average; SO = Strikeouts

Other pitchers 
Note: G = Games pitched; IP = Innings pitched; W = Wins; L = Losses; ERA = Earned run average; SO = Strikeouts

Relief pitchers 
Note: G = Games pitched; W = Wins; L = Losses; SV = Saves; ERA = Earned run average; SO = Strikeouts

Awards and honors
 Jeff Bagwell, First Base, National League Rookie of the Year

Farm system 

LEAGUE CHAMPIONS: Tucson

References

External links
1991 Houston Astros season at Baseball Reference

Houston Astros seasons
Houston Astros season
Houston